Odostomia monodon is a species of sea snail, a marine gastropod mollusc in the family Pyramidellidae, the pyrams and their allies.

This species is considered a synonym of Odostomia conoidea

References

External links
 To World Register of Marine Species

monodon
Gastropods described in 1848